13 Ah Visnaa Dhehaas is a 2012 Maldivian political comedy short film directed by Abdulla Muaz. Produced by Mohamed Abdulla under Dhekedheke Ves Productions, the film stars Abdulla, Niuma Mohamed, Ismail Rasheed and Fathimath Azifa in pivotal roles. The entire film was shot in R. Ungoofaaru. At the 3rd Maldives Film Awards ceremony, the film was nominated in eight categories.

Premise
The film revolves around the conflict of two political parties, Maldives Democratic Party (MDP) and Progressive Party of Maldives (PPM) where two couples representing each party involves in political and personal complications in regards to the 2013 Presidency of Maldives. The film also incorporates several actual footage from the campaign events held by MDP. The film ends with PPM activist, Hussein Fulhu (Mohamed Abdulla) and MDP activist, Ismail Fulhu (Ismail Rasheed) unintentionally divorcing their respective wives, Zuleykha (Fathimath Azifa) and Mariyam Zeeniya (Niuma Mohamed).

Cast 
 Mohamed Abdulla as Hussein Fulhu
 Niuma Mohamed as Mariyam Zeeniya
 Ismail Rasheed as Ismail Fulhu
 Fathimath Azifa as Zuleykha
 Ali Waheed as President Mohamed Nasheed

Soundtrack

Accolades

References

Maldivian short films
2012 short films
2012 films